Marine Fauthoux (born 23 January 2001) is a French basketball player for the French national team.

She represented France at the FIBA Women's EuroBasket 2019.

She is the daughter of Frédéric Fauthoux, former point guard of Élan Béarnais and of the French national team, now assistant coach of ASVEL Basket.

References

External links

2001 births
Living people
Basketball players at the 2020 Summer Olympics
French women's basketball players
France women's national basketball team players
Medalists at the 2020 Summer Olympics
New York Liberty draft picks
Olympic basketball players of France
Olympic bronze medalists for France
Olympic medalists in basketball
Point guards
Sportspeople from Pau, Pyrénées-Atlantiques
Tarbes Gespe Bigorre players